Rouville is a regional county municipality in the Montérégie region of Quebec, Canada.  Its seat is Marieville.

Subdivisions
There are 8 subdivisions within the RCM:

Cities & Towns (3)
 Marieville
 Richelieu
 Saint-Césaire

Municipalities (5)
 Ange-Gardien
 Rougemont
 Saint-Mathias-sur-Richelieu
 Saint-Paul-d'Abbotsford
 Sainte-Angèle-de-Monnoir

Demographics

Population

Language

Transportation

Access Routes
Highways and numbered routes that run through the municipality, including external routes that start or finish at the county border:

 Autoroutes
 

 Principal Highways
 
 
 
 

 Secondary Highways
 
 
 
 
 

 External Routes
 None

See also
 List of regional county municipalities and equivalent territories in Quebec

References

 
Census divisions of Quebec